In mathematics, given a group , a quasimorphism (or quasi-morphism) is a function  which is additive up to bounded error, i.e. there exists a constant  such that  for all . For a group , quasimorphisms form a subspace of the function space .

Examples 
The sum of a group homomorphism and a bounded function is also a quasimorphism, and functions of this form are sometimes referred to as "trivial" quasimorphisms.
 Let  be a free group over a set . Then, a big counting quasimorphism (resp. little counting quasimorphism) is a function of the form  (resp. .
 The rotation number  is a quasimorphism, where  denotes the orientation-preserving homeomorphisms of the circle.

Homogeneous quasimorphisms 
A quasimorphism is homogeneous if  for all . It turns out the study of quasimorphisms can be reduced to the study of homogeneous quasimorphisms, as every quasimorphism  is a bounded distance away from a unique homogeneous quasimorphism , given by :
.
A homogeneous quasimorphism  has the following properties:
 It is constant on conjugacy classes, i.e.  for all ,
 If  is abelian, then  is a group homomorphism. The above remark implies that in this case all quasimorphisms are "trivial".

Integer-valued quasimorphisms 
One can also define quasimorphisms similarly in the case of a function .

There is a construction of the real numbers as a quotient of quasimorphisms  by an appropriate equivalence relation, see Construction of the reals numbers from integers (Eudoxus reals).

Notes

References

Further reading 
What is a Quasi-morphism? by D. Kotschick

Mathematics
Additive functions